Pont-Scorff is a commune in the Morbihan department of Brittany in north-western France. It takes its name from the river Scorff, which flows through the town. Inhabitants of Pont-Scorff are called in French Scorvipontains or Scorffipontais.

Geography

The town lies in the valley of the river Scorff. Historically, it belongs to Vannetais.

Map

Breton language
The municipality launched a linguistic plan through Ya d'ar brezhoneg on 22 February 2008.

In 2008, 8.74% of children attended the bilingual schools in primary education.

See also
Communes of the Morbihan department
Gaston-Auguste Schweitzer Sculptor statue of Fernand de Langle de Cary

References

External links

 Mayors of Morbihan Association 

Communes of Morbihan